Conquista (Conquest) may refer to:
La Conquista, Spanish colonization of the Americas

Music and dance 
 La Conquista (opera), 2005 opera by Lorenzo Ferrero
 Baile de la Conquista, a dance which reenacts the Spanish conquest of Guatemala

Places 
 Conquista, Andalusia, town in Spain
 Conquista, Minas Gerais, city in Brazil
 Conquista, Spain, a municipality in the province of Córdoba, Spain
 Conquista de la Sierra, municipality located in the province of Cáceres, Extremadura, Spain
 La Conquista, Nicaragua, municipality in the Nicaraguan department of Carazo
 Vitória da Conquista, city in the Brazilian state of Bahia

Other uses 
 Conquista rose, a modern hybrid tea rose

See also
Reconquista (disambiguation)